Jeyran Bolaghi (also Romanized as Jeyrān Bolāghī; also known as Jeiran Bolagh, Jeyrān Bolāgh, Jirānbolāgh, and Jirān Bulāqi) is a village in Barvanan-e Gharbi Rural District, Torkamanchay District, Meyaneh County, East Azerbaijan Province, Iran. At the 2006 census, its population was 163, in 34 families.

References 

Populated places in Meyaneh County